The VerbNet project maps PropBank verb types to their corresponding Levin classes. It is a lexical resource that incorporates both semantic and syntactic information about its contents.

VerbNet is part of the SemLink project in development at the University of Colorado.

Related projects
 UBY a database of 10 resources including VerbNet.

External links
Karin Kipper's dissertation — VerbNet: a broad-coverage, comprehensive verb lexicon
Martha Palmer's Verbnet page — contains download of the VerbNet XML files and web interface to the database
Unified Verb Index — unified index to three lexical semantic resources, VerbNet, PropBank, and FrameNet

Lexical databases
Corpora